Jack Williamson Ragland (October 9, 1913 – June 14, 1996) was an American basketball player who competed in the 1936 Summer Olympics.

He was part of the American basketball team, which won the gold medal. He played two matches including the final.

He played college basketball at Wichita State University.

External links
profile
USA Basketball All-Time Roster.

1913 births
1996 deaths
Basketball players at the 1936 Summer Olympics
Medalists at the 1936 Summer Olympics
Olympic gold medalists for the United States in basketball
Phillips 66ers players
United States men's national basketball team players
American men's basketball players
Wichita State Shockers men's basketball players